Invisible Enemy is a 1938 American crime film directed by John H. Auer and written by Norman Burnstine and Alex Gottlieb. The film stars Alan Marshal, Tala Birell, Mady Correll, C. Henry Gordon, Herbert Mundin and Gerald Oliver Smith. The film was released on April 4, 1938, by Republic Pictures.

Plot
The film takes place in London and Paris, where Jeffrey Clavering is sent to prevent vital oilfields falling into the hands of a villainous industrialist working for a hostile foreign power.

Cast 
Alan Marshal as Jeffrey Clavering
Tala Birell as Sandra Kamarov
Mady Correll as Princess Stephanie
C. Henry Gordon as Nikolai Kamarov
Herbert Mundin as Sergeant Alfred M. Higgs
Gerald Oliver Smith as Bassett
Ivan Simpson as Michael
Elsa Buchanan as Sophia
Dwight Frye as Alex
Leonard Willey as Sir Herbert Donbridge
Ian Maclaren as Sir Joshua Longstreet
Egon Brecher as Kirman
Frank Puglia as Signor Bramucci

References

External links
 

1938 films
1930s English-language films
American crime films
1938 crime films
Republic Pictures films
Films directed by John H. Auer
American black-and-white films
Films set in Paris
Films set in London
1930s American films